TrueSpace (styled as trueSpace) was a commercial 3D computer graphics and animation software developed by Caligari Corporation, bought-out by Microsoft. As of May 2009, it was officially discontinued, but with some 'unofficial support' up to February 2010.

History 
The company was founded in 1985 by Roman Ormandy. A prototype 3D video animation package for the Amiga Computer led to the incorporation of Octree Software in 1986. From 1988 to 1992, Octree released several software packages including Caligari1, Caligari2, Caligari Broadcast, and Caligari 24. Caligari wanted to provide inexpensive yet professional, industrial video and corporate presentation software. In 1993 Octree Software moved from New York to California and became known as Caligari Corporation. In 1994 trueSpace 1.0 was introduced on the Windows platform. In 1998 an employee inadvertently left a copy of the trueSpace 4.0 sourcecode on the company website's public FTP server. The source code was released to the internet by the piracy release group REVOLT.
In early 2008, the company was acquired by Microsoft and trueSpace 7.6 was released for free.

As of May 19, 2009, Ormandy announced that TrueSpace had been discontinued:

Elsewhere he thanks everyone, urges people to download all the free software as soon as possible.

After 2010, many of the talented developers helped develop Microsoft's 3D Builder application available for free in the Windows Store. There are many similarities between 3D Builder and the original TrueSpace product even though the former is aimed at a consumer level.

Overview 
TrueSpace was a modeling/animation/rendering package. It featured a plug-in architecture that allowed the user to create tools to enhance the core package. TrueSpace was at the last release version 7 (also known to its users as tS7). Point upgrades had brought it up to version Rosetta Beta 7.61 and had added new modeling features. It also had an interface that beginners found easy to learn.

Caligari had enhanced the modeling, surfacing and rendering capabilities of TrueSpace, and the latest version TrueSpace7 allowed all aspects of real-time design, modeling and animation within a virtual 3D space shared by remote participants over the broadband internet. The TrueSpace7 collaboration server enables multiple participants to connect to a shared 3D space to create and manipulate shared content in real-time.

Features 
One of the most distinctive features of trueSpace is its interface, using mainly 3D widgets for most common editing operations. trueSpace can also be scripted, using Python for creating custom scripts, tools and plugins. trueSpace7 introduces the use of VBScript and JScript as scripting tools for developing plugins and interactive scenes. trueSpace is also known for its icon-heavy interface which was drastically overhauled for version 7 onwards. While staff at Caligari had originally made them 'inhouse' during the creation process of earlier releases, trueSpace 7 had a new set of icons made by Paul Woodward, a freelance designer and illustrator.

Capabilities of the software include creating visualizations and animations with realistic lighting (through the use of radiosity, HDRI and global illumination) and organic modelling using NURBS, subdivision surfaces and metaballs.

The software has several native formats: RsScn for scenes, RsObj for objects, RSMat for materials, rsl for layouts, RsLgts for lighting, etc. Older formats native to trueSpace6.6 and earlier are also supported, e.g. one for standalone objects (with the file extension .cob), and another for the scenes (with the file extension .scn). Objects in trueSpace can be embedded in Active Worlds. In addition to its native formats, trueSpace can also import and export several additional model types.

Modeling 
Polygon modeling
NURBS
Subdivision surface

Rendering and surfacing 
Currently TrueSpace has two native internal rendering engines and also support for DX9 pixel shader output quality images alongside the traditional style Render engines. These engines are:

 LightWorks (from Lightwork Design Ltd.)
 VirtuaLight 

TrueSpace7 also includes support for the VRay rendering engine.

Rendering
HDRI
Caustics
Multi-pass Rendering for the Lightworks rendering engine with output to Photoshop layers integrated into TrueSpace7
Hybrid radiosity, ray tracing, Phong shading
Image-based lighting
Non-linear tone mapping editor
Post process editor
Advanced shaders (color, reflectance, transparency, displacement, background, foreground, post processing)
Volumetric, anisotropic reflectance

Surfacing
DX9 (SL2.0) pixel shaders and HLSL editing 
Procedural shaders editable in Link Editor
Normal mapping
Shader trees
Modeless UV Editor
Advanced UV Editor with real time UV mapping controls
Unwrapper with Slice
Breaking and welding of vertices in a UV map

See also

 Lightwave 3D
 Cinema 4D
 Modo
 Blender
 Aladdin4D
 Bryce

References

External links
 Caligari's official website (archive)
 An archive of the original Caligari sponsored forums
 trueSpace FAQs including download links
 trueSpace Unofficial Website
 YouTube TrueSpace Videos
 Moonman's trueSpace Resources
 trueSpace Wiki
 Truespacers - a trueSpace group on DeviantArt

3D graphics software
Freeware 3D graphics software
Amiga raytracers